Beaumont Health is Southeast Michigan’s largest health care system (based on inpatient admissions and net patient revenue). The organization, headquartered in Southfield, Michigan, has net revenue of $4.7 billion and consists of eight hospitals with 3,375 beds, 155 outpatient sites, nearly 5,000 physicians, more than 33,000 employees and about 2,000 volunteers. In 2019, Beaumont had 179,600 discharges, 17,600 births and 577,000 emergency visits. The flagship hospital of the system is the Beaumont Hospital, Royal Oak, located in the Detroit suburb of Royal Oak, Michigan.

History
In 2022 Beaumont and Spectrum Health announced their merger was effective on February 1, 2022, because the federal government determined this would not violate antitrust regulations. The new system is called BHSH Health, a temporary name, with Spectrum Health CEO Tina Freese Decker as the head and with both existing headquarters operating. John Fox, the head of Beaumont Health, resigned on February 4, 2022.

Locations

Beaumont Hospital, Dearborn
Dearborn, a 632-bed hospital and Level 2 trauma center, is located at 18101 Oakwood Blvd, Dearborn MI 48124.

Beaumont Hospital, Farmington Hills
Beaumont Hospital, Farmington Hills is a 330-bed health care facility.

Specialities include cancer, diabetes and endocrinology, ear, nose and throat, gastroenterology and gastrointestinal surgery, geriatrics, gynecology, nephrology, neurology and neurosurgery, orthopedics, pediatrics, pulmonology and urology.

Beaumont Hospital, Grosse Pointe
Beaumont Hospital, Grosse Pointe, is a 280-bed hospital located at 468 Cadieux Rd, Grosse Pointe, Michigan. On October 1, 2007 it was acquired by Beaumont Health System from Bon Secours Health System Inc. 

Specialties include diabetes and endocrinology, ear, nose and throat, gastroenterology and GI surgery, geriatrics, gynecology, nephrology, neurology and neurosurgery, orthopedics, pulmonology and urology.

Beaumont Hospital, Royal Oak

The largest Beaumont hospital is Beaumont Hospital, Royal Oak, an academic medical center located at 3601 W. Thirteen Mile Road in Royal Oak, Michigan, and houses 1,109 inpatient beds. The complex also includes cancer, renal, vascular, heart, radiology and neuroscience centers as well as a research institute and a medical building with private practices and other Beaumont services. This location is a Level 1 Trauma Center and has a dedicated heliport.

Beaumont Hospital, Taylor
Beaumont Hospital, Taylor is a 180-bed hospital located at 10000 Telegraph Rd, Taylor, Michigan.

Specialties include physical medicine and rehabilitation, geriatrics, nephrology, orthopedics, pulmonology and urology.

Beaumont Hospital, Trenton
Beaumont Hospital, Trenton is located at 5450 Fort St, Trenton, Michigan.

Specialties include diabetes and endocrinology, gastroenterology and GI surgery, geriatrics, nephrology, neurology and neurosurgery, orthopedics, pulmonology and urology.

Beaumont Hospital, Troy
The 520-bed campus of the Beaumont Hospital, Troy is located at 44201 Dequindre Road in Troy, Michigan south of South Blvd/20 Mile Road. Built in 1977 this hospital location offers inpatient and outpatient services as well as private practices. This location has a pedestrian bridge to a medical office building across Dequindre Road. This puts this campus in two cities and two counties, the City of Troy, Michigan and the City of Sterling Heights, Michigan, as well as Oakland and Macomb Counties.

Specialties include cancer, cardiology and heart surgery, diabetes and endocrinology, ear, nose and throat, gastroenterology and GI surgery, geriatrics, gynecology, nephrology, neurology and neurosurgery, orthopedics, pediatrics, pulmonology and urology.

Beaumont Hospital, Wayne
Since 1957, Beaumont Hospital, Wayne, a 185-bed hospital is located at 33155 Annapolis St, Wayne, Michigan.

Specialties include diabetes and endocrinology, gastroenterology and GI surgery, geriatrics, nephrology, neurology and neurosurgery, orthopedics, pulmonology and urology.

In addition to these eight hospitals, Beaumont Health also offers 187 ambulatory/outpatient sites including, emergency and urgent care, outpatient and medical centers, outpatient laboratory centers, outpatient pharmacies, physical therapy centers, imaging centers, senior living and nursing homes and wellness and fitness centers.

Beaumont Children’s
Beaumont Children's Hospital, now Beaumont Children's, was announced in 2009. Eighty-three sub-specialists, a 40-bed pediatric unit, eight-bed pediatric ICU and 64-bed NICU had been in place at Beaumont, Royal Oak since 2004. In 2008, Beaumont joined the National Association of Children's Hospitals and Related Institutions.

Facilities include a dedicated specialty inpatient pediatric unit at Beaumont, Royal Oak and inpatient units at the Beaumont hospitals in Troy, Dearborn and Farmington Hills for children with less serious conditions. Specialty pediatric services including emergency care, hematology-oncology, gastroenterology, endocrinology, cardiology, neurology, newborn and pediatric intensive care, pediatric surgery and craniofacial surgery are available at outpatient locations throughout Metro Detroit.

Beaumont Children's cares for more than 100,000 pediatric emergency and after-hours visits every year and 17,000 babies are delivered each year as well.

Beaumont Children's is a member of the Children's Hospital Association and the only Southeast Michigan affiliate of Children's Miracle Network Hospitals.

Headquarters
The headquarters of Beaumont Health are in the  First Center Office Plaza in Southfield, which it acquired in 2017 to centralize its administrative offices.

Medical school and teaching hospital
In 2010, Oakland University and William Beaumont Hospital opened an allopathic medical school called Oakland University William Beaumont School of Medicine (OUWB) admitting its first class of 50 students. The school was granted full accreditation by the Liaison Committee on Medical Education and graduated its first class in 2015. The school currently accepts 125 students per year.

Beaumont serves as a teaching hospital through an exclusive partnership with Oakland University William Beaumont School of Medicine and also through partnerships with Michigan State University College of Osteopathic Medicine, Michigan State University College of Human Medicine, and Wayne State University School of Medicine. 

Beaumont Health has approximately 932 residents and fellows and offers 94 residency and fellowship programs. Research opportunities are also available through the Beaumont Research Institute.

Community health
Beaumont's community outreach activities include: health screenings, community education, speakers bureau, food drives, walks and career fairs.

In 2018, Beaumont provided more than $330 million in community benefit.

Key statistics

2017 data (as of 2/21/2018)

History

Beaumont
Groundbreaking began in 1953 for "Oakland Hospital," but because of a delivery mix-up and to further distinguish itself from nearby Oakwood Hospital it was decided to change the name of the new hospital. The new name was William Beaumont Hospital (WBH), the doors were officially open on January 24, 1955 with 238-beds in Royal Oak, Michigan in 1955. The hospitals, the overall health system and the Oakland University William Beaumont School of Medicine are all named for William Beaumont, a U.S. Army surgeon who became known as the "Father of Gastric Physiology" following his research on human digestion started at Fort Mackinac on Mackinac Island, Michigan.

Botsford
In 1965, Botsford General Hospital opened with 200 beds adjacent to the historic Botsford Inn, a former stagecoach stop on Grand River in Farmington Hills. The hospital opened as an expansion to Zieger Clinic Hospital in Detroit, opened by Dr. Allen Zieger in 1944.

Oakwood
Oakwood Hospital opened on Jan. 5, 1953 and grew to include four hospitals and ambulatory centers in and around Dearborn.

The decision to build a "voluntary" hospital on land donated by Henry Ford II and Ford Motor Company was controversial at the time, as Dearborn mayor Orville L. Hubbard supported a competing proposal for a municipal facility. After months of contentious debate, the voluntary hospital plan was approved, with the ground-breaking taking place in August 1950.

Beaumont Health
In March 2014, the Beaumont Health System, along with Botsford Health Care and Oakwood Healthcare, signed a letter of intent to merge their operations.

Failed merger attempt with Advocate Aurora
In 2020, Beaumont and Advocate Aurora, a 28-hospital system in Illinois and Wisconsin, announced plans to merge into a combined company worth $17 billion. These plans were called off in October 2020, in part because physicians, lawmakers, staff, and donors were concerned that it would harm patient care.

Executive bonuses, layoffs, and calls for termination of executives
Beaumont was harshly criticized by some of its physicians and other staff for paying bonuses to its executives, including million to CEO John Fox, amid laying off thousands of workers and receiving million in Federal CARES Act funds related to the COVID-19 pandemic. A long-time Beaumont cardiologist, Robert Safian, sent letters to its board calling for termination of CEO John Fox, as well as the chief operating officer and the chief medical officer. Safian cited the "toxic culture" of fear and intimidation and implementation of cost-saving measures that impact patient care and force physicians out of the system. A number of other leading physicians at Beaumont have sent letters of complaint.

Merger with Spectrum Health
In June 2021, Beaumont health announced plans to merge with Spectrum health. In 2022 Beaumont and Spectrum announced their merger was effective on February 1, 2022, because the federal government determined this would not violate antitrust regulations. The new system is called Corewell Health, with Spectrum Health CEO Tina Freese Decker as the head and with both existing headquarters operating.

See also
William Beaumont
Beaumont (disambiguation)

References

External links

Beaumont Health

Healthcare in Michigan
Hospital networks in the United States
Voluntary hospitals